Gnathoenia is a genus of longhorn beetles of the subfamily Lamiinae.

 Gnathoenia albescens Breuning, 1939
 Gnathoenia albomaculata Quedenfeldt, 1881
 Gnathoenia alboplagiata Jordan, 1894
 Gnathoenia bialbata Fairmaire, 1891
 Gnathoenia congoana Belon, 1901
 Gnathoenia flavovariegata Breuning, 1935
 Gnathoenia schoutedeni Breuning, 1935
 Gnathoenia tropica (Duvivier, 1891)
 Gnathoenia venerea Thomson, 1858
 Gnathoenia zonifera Harold, 1879

References

Ceroplesini